Governor Stone may refer to:

David Stone (politician) (1770–1818), governor of North Carolina, 1808–1810
John Hoskins Stone (1750–1804), 7th Governor of Maryland
John Marshall Stone (1830–1900), governor of Mississippi, 1876–1882 and 1890–1896
Governor Stone (schooner), a cargo freighter built in 1877, named for the Mississippi governor
Raymond Stone (fl. 1900s), governor of Guam in 1904
William A. Stone (1846–1920), 22nd Governor of Pennsylvania
William J. Stone (1848–1918), governor of Missouri, 1893–1897
William M. Stone (1827–1893), 6th Governor of Iowa
William Stone (Maryland governor) (1603–1660), governor of the Province of Maryland, 1649–1655